The 2011 East Northamptonshire District Council election took place on 5 May 2011 to elect members of East Northamptonshire District Council in Northamptonshire, England. This was the first election to be held under new ward boundaries. The Conservative Party retained overall control of the council.

References

2011 English local elections
2011
2010s in Northamptonshire